Richard “Dick” Zimmerman (born August 11, 1937) is a ragtime performer, historian, author and producer. He is regarded as being one of the key figures responsible for the worldwide revival of ragtime. Zimmerman is the first pianist to have recorded the complete works of Scott Joplin and in 1987 was awarded the first place prize “Champion Ragtime Performer of the World”. Zimmerman was technical advisor for the film Scott Joplin. He is a founder of the "Maple Leaf Club", and is the editor of its publication, "The Rag Times". Zimmerman is also a professional magician. He has contributed many signature illusions to the field of magic and has acted as consultant for such magicians as David Copperfield.

Life and career
Zimmerman was trained as a child in classical music, but quickly abandoned his studies to pursue his love for ragtime when his magic teacher played a honky-tonk record
 by "one of the great American composers, Scott Joplin."

In 1956 he enrolled at Stanford University where he received degrees in civil and mechanical engineering. Zimmerman later went on to design games for Mattel, Inc. As a freshman, a classmate introduced him to the rags of Scott Joplin. But it wasn’t until 1973, when the movie The Sting began the revival of ragtime with a musical score by Marvin Hamlisch, which adapted the original rags of Scott Joplin, that Zimmerman turned his attention to performing and recording. In 1974, he released the five-LP collection ‘’Scott Joplin: His Complete Works’’ on the Murray Hill Records label.

In 1967 Zimmerman, along with Dave Bourne, Albert Huerta, Chuck McClure, and Bill Mitchell, founded the ‘’Maple Leaf Club’’, for which he edited its newsletter, "The Rag Times". In 1998 the ‘’Maple Leaf Club’’ merged with the ‘’Rose Leaf Club’’.

As a producer, Zimmerman created the ragtime concert series ‘’Where It Was!’’ in Los Angeles. The venue featured ragtime stars from both the past and present, including such legends as pianist and composer Eubie Blake, who once said of Zimmerman: "[Dick] is a real ragtime pianist, and he knows more about its history than I do!"

Zimmerman has appeared in concert and at music festivals throughout the United States and Canada. He has appeared on The Tonight Show with Johnny Carson, PBS, BBC-TV, BBC World Service Radio, as well as the Canadian Broadcasting Co. and Australia Broadcasting. He has performed in concert at the Montreal International Jazz Festival in Canada and the Montreux Jazz Festival in Switzerland. He has also served as long-time musical director of the "Scott Joplin Ragtime Festival in Sedalia, Missouri". He was the recipient of the Scott Joplin Foundation Achievement Award in 1991.

Today, Zimmerman runs "American Ragtime Co.", recording and publishing ragtime classics and the works of early 20th century blues composers.

Magic career

Zimmerman is known for originating many illusions in the field of magic. He was a member of the Academy of Magical Arts Board, located at The Magic Castle in Los Angeles, California, and also the Director of AMA's annual "It's Magic" show. Dick and his wife Diane Zimmerman performed together as a husband-and-wife team in several magic acts, including one televised segment on the Merv Griffin Show.

Zimmerman Illusions
 Zimmerman Linking Hula Hoops
 Prediction System
 Dancing Ring on Rope
 Crystal Clear Card Box
 Clearly Impossible
 Zimmer Egg
 Zimmer Stab
 Sure Thing
 Rough and Ready (Again)
 Plonk/Zimmer Shaker
 Rattled 
 Digital Delusion

Discography
 Scott Joplin - His Complete Works – Label: Murray Hill Records (Murray Hill Records 931079) (1974)
 Scott Joplin, The Entertainer - Label: Olympic Records (1974)
 The Collector's History of Ragtime – Label: Murray Hill Records (1980)
 Ragtime - Label: Music For Pleasure (1984)
 Roots of Ragtime - Label: Madacy (1994)
 King of Ragtime – Label: Delta Distribution (1995)
 Gems of Texas Ragtime – Label: American Ragtime Company (1997)
 Long Lost Blues - Label: PianoMania Music (1997)
 Scott Joplin's Greatest Hits - Label: Legacy International (2009)
 Ragtime Favorites – Label: American Ragtime

Television Appearances
 "The Minstrel Man" (CBS)
 "The Tonight Show" (NBC)

Additional Links
 MagicPedia - Dick Zimmerman
 List of Zimmerman's CDs
 Merv Griffin Appearance

References

1937 births
Living people
American magicians
Ragtime composers
Ragtime pianists
20th-century American pianists
American male pianists
21st-century American pianists
20th-century American male musicians
21st-century American male musicians
Academy of Magical Arts Lecturer of the Year winners